The Amateur Gentleman is a novel. It may also refer to the following adaptations of the novel:
 The Amateur Gentleman (1920 film), a British film
 The Amateur Gentleman (1926 film), an American film
 The Amateur Gentleman (1936 film), a British film